Portuguese Basketball Champions Tournament Cup or Torneio dos Campeões was a competition for Portuguese teams that play in the Portuguese Basketball League (LCB).

Portuguese Champions Tournament Winners

References

http://www.fpb.pt/fpb2014/!site.go?s=1&show=my.cat02&codigo=HIST-CM

http://www.fpb.pt/fpb_zone/portal/img/home_317/fotos/205000303300022312842220414.pdf

 
Champions Tournament
Liga Portuguesa de Basquetebol